Knippa is a census-designated place (CDP) in Uvalde County, Texas, United States. The population was 689 at the 2010 census.

Geography
Knippa is located at  (29.295467, -99.639166).

Demographics
As of the census of 2000, there were 739 people, 246 households, and 180 families residing in the CDP. The population density was 70.9 people per square mile (27.4/km2). There were 280 housing units at an average density of 26.9/sq mi (10.4/km2). The racial makeup of the CDP was 71.58% White, 0.27% African American, 0.81% Native American, 0.41% Pacific Islander, 20.57% from other races, and 6.36% from two or more races. Hispanic or Latino of any race were 55.35% of the population.

There were 246 households, out of which 42.7% had children under the age of 18 living with them, 60.6% were married couples living together, 10.2% had a female householder with no husband present, and 26.8% were non-families. 24.8% of all households were made up of individuals, and 9.3% had someone living alone who was 65 years of age or older. The average household size was 3.00 and the average family size was 3.69.

In the CDP, the population was spread out, with 33.6% under the age of 18, 10.3% from 18 to 24, 27.2% from 25 to 44, 19.8% from 45 to 64, and 9.2% who were 65 years of age or older. The median age was 30 years. For every 100 females, there were 98.7 males. For every 100 females age 18 and over, there were 97.2 males.

The median income for a household in the CDP was $29,375, and the median income for a family was $31,667. Males had a median income of $20,741 versus $19,722 for females. The per capita income for the CDP was $9,790. About 15.5% of families and 20.0% of the population were below the poverty line, including 24.1% of those under age 18 and 23.2% of those age 65 or over.

Education
Knippa is served by the Knippa Independent School District.

Climate
The climate in this area is characterized by hot, humid summers and generally mild to cool winters.  According to the Köppen Climate Classification system, Knippa has a humid subtropical climate, abbreviated "Cfa" on climate maps.

References

Census-designated places in Texas
Census-designated places in Uvalde County, Texas